The Kroger Queen City Championship Presented By P&G, is a women's professional golf tournament on the LPGA Tour. It was founded in 2022 in Cincinnati, Ohio. The tournament is televised by the Golf Channel. 

Ally Ewing won the inaugural event with a final round 66 that included five straight birdies on the back-nine. It was the first time in over 30 years that an LPGA Tour event was played in southwest Ohio.

Winners

Tournament records

Source:

References

External links
 Coverage on the LPGA Tour's official site
 Kenwood Country Club
 Kendale Course

LPGA Tour events
Golf in Ohio
Sports competitions in Ohio
Sports in Cincinnati
Recurring sporting events established in 2022
2022 establishments in Ohio
Women's sports in Ohio